Lo-Toga is an Oceanic language spoken by about 580 people on the islands of Lo and Toga, in the Torres group of northern Vanuatu. The language has sometimes been called Loh (sic) or Toga, after either of its two dialects.

Name
The language is named after the two islands where it is spoken: Lo and Toga.

Situation and dialects
Its 580 speakers live mostly in Lo and Toga, the two main islands in the southern half of the Torres group. The same language is also spoken by the small populations of the two other islands of Linua and Tegua.

Lo-Toga is itself divided into two very close dialects, Lo (spoken on Lo island) and Toga (spoken on Toga). The inhabitants of northern Vanuatu generally don't draw a distinction between dialects and languages.

Conversely, Lo-Toga is a distinct language from the other language of the Torres group, Hiw.

Phonology
The Lo dialect of Lo-Toga phonemically contrasts 16 consonants and 13 vowels.

Consonants

Vowels
The 13 vowel phonemes of the Lo dialect include 8 monophthongs /i e ɛ a ə ɔ o ʉ/, and five diphthongs /i͡e i͡ɛ i͡a o͡ə o͡ɔ/.

Grammar
Lo-Toga presents various forms of verb serialization.

The system of personal pronouns contrasts clusivity, and distinguishes three numbers (singular, dual, plural).

Together with its neighbour Hiw, Lo-Toga has developed a rich system of verbal number, whereby certain verbs change their root depending on the number of their main participant. Lo-Toga has 18 such pairs of verbs.

Spatial reference in Lo-Toga is based on a system of geocentric (absolute) directionals, which is in part typical of Oceanic languages, and yet innovative.

References

Bibliography

 

 

 .

External links
 Linguistic map of north Vanuatu, showing range of Lo-Toga.
 Audio recordings in the Lo-Toga language, in open access, by A. François (source: Pangloss Collection).
 Online Lo-Toga—English dictionary by A. François (work in progress)
 Ne Vavatema Vivda Pah Tage Vivda Volquane Lema Rua Portions of the Book of Common Prayer in Toga (1907)

Languages of Vanuatu
Banks–Torres languages
Torba Province